Andre El Haddad (born 8 February 1971) is a Lebanese former football referee. He was a FIFA listed referee between 2007 and 2013, and has officiated several international and continental competitions.

Refereeing career 
El Haddad was a referee in several AFC Champions League matches between 2011 and 2013. He has officiated 16 matches, giving out a total of 53 yellow cards.

He was the referee for the 2014 FIFA World Cup qualification third round match between China and Singapore held on 2 September 2011.

In February 2012, in the final game of the Third Round of AFC qualifying, El Haddad refereed the match between Bahrain and Indonesia, who were without many of its most experienced players due to a dispute between the two competing Indonesian national leagues. Going into the match, Bahrain needed at least a nine-goal victory over Indonesia, in addition to a defeat by group rivals Qatar in against Iran in order to advance to the Fourth Round of qualifying. Bahrain won the match 10–0, a record victory for Bahrain and a record defeat for Indonesia.

References

External links 
 
 
 

1971 births
Living people
People from Zahle
Lebanese football referees